Nelly Mbangu is a Congolese women's and children's rights campaigner.  She has been involved in many non-governmental organisations in this field and co-founded a movement to bring together 30 organisations with similar aims. She is a woman human rights defender and the coordinator of the Help and Action for Piece - Aide et Action pour la Paix (AAP). Additionally Help and Action for Piece - Aide et Action pour la Paix (AAP) works on good governance topics , conflict resolution of land rights disputes. Those issues often affect women, for this reason Help and Action for piece links these topics together to positively impact the human rights situation in locally.

Career 
Nelly Mbangu campaigns for the rights of women and children in  North Kivu, Democratic Republic of Congo.  One of her main aims is to teach children that women can have important roles beyond the kitchen.  In 2000 Mbangu welcomed the implementation of UN Security Council Resolution 1325 which increased the involvement of women in UN peace and security missions; she had seen at first hand how blockages in access to services had impacted on women in refugee camps.

Mbangu is a co-founder and president of the Dynamique des femmes jurists (DFJ) a non-governmental organisation that works to raise awareness of women's rights issues in Eastern Congo. DFJ seeks to provide legal advice to women and to improve their access to justice.  DFJ also provides financial aid, psychological care and social services to survivors of sexual and domestic violence.

Mbangu was a director for the Democracy Research Center, an organisation led jointly by Development Alternatives Incorporated, USAID and the Goma Refugee Camp, from 2006 to 2008.  She was a project manager for HelpAge International from October 2009 to 31 March 2011.  From August 2012 to January 2017 Mbangu was a coordinator for Aide et Action pour la Paix (AAP), an organisation seeking to improve women's and children's rights, promote good governance, resolve land disputes and provide protection of the environment and natural resource.  Mbangu sits on the AAP Africa steering committee.

Mbangu also helped to set-up Sauti ya Mama Mukongomani, a "women's movement for peace and security" that brings together 30 of the leading women's organisations in the Congo.  Since February 2017 she has been a program officer for the Fonds pour les Femmes Congolaises.

References 

Republic of the Congo humanitarians
Democratic Republic of the Congo women
Women human rights activists